Mendig is a station in the town of  Mendig in the German state of Rhineland-Palatinate. It was called Niedermendig until 1877. It is located on the Cross Eifel Railway (Eifelquerbahn), which has two tracks from Andernach station and continues as a single track to Gerolstein station. The only set of points at the station is located west of the platform just before the Bahnstraße level crossing and has the points number of 23.

Services

The Cross Eifel Railway is served by Regionalbahn line Lahn-Eifel-Bahn: RB 23 (Mayen Ost – Koblenz Hbf – Limburg) and RB 38 (Kaisersesch – Mayen Ost – Andernach).

Emperor station

The station building was built in 1877 to a design of the Cologne architect Gustav Päffgen. The so-called Kaiserbahnhof (Emperor station) got its name because Emperor Wilhelm II used the station as a starting point for visits to the Eifel. It has been shown that he took a carriage from the station to visit the Maria Laach Abbey. It is considered one of the most beautiful historic buildings in the region around Mendig.

The stately design shows the importance that the railway had as a means of transport. The façade mainly displays Gothic Revival elements and the structure is accessible via a two-flight staircase. The walls are divided by cornices and the building edges are accentuated by corner blocks.

The now restored building has been converted into a residential and office building. It is now privately owned.

References

Railway stations in Rhineland-Palatinate
Railway stations in Germany opened in 1877
Buildings and structures in Mayen-Koblenz
Eifel
Gothic Revival architecture in Germany